Robert Bonner may refer to:

Robert C. Bonner (born 1942), American lawyer and government official
Robert E. Bonner (1824–1899), American newspaper editor
Robert Bonner (baseball) (1894–?), American baseball player
Robert Bonner (politician) (1920–2005), Canadian politician and corporate executive
 Bobby Bonner (Robert Averill Bonner, born 1956), baseball player